Ashrafunnesa Mosharraf (died 18 January 2019) was a Bangladesh Awami League politician who served as a Jatiya Sangsad member from reserved seats for women and the president of Bangladesh Mohila Awami League.

Career
Mosharraf fought in the Bangladesh Liberation war. She was elected to Parliament from a women's reserved seat in 2009. She became the president of the Mohila Awami League on 12 July 2003.

Death
Mosharraf died on 18 January 2019 in Square Hospital, Dhaka, Bangladesh.

References

1940s births
2019 deaths
Awami League politicians
Women members of the Jatiya Sangsad
9th Jatiya Sangsad members
Place of birth missing
Date of birth missing
21st-century Bangladeshi women politicians